Gardner Howe (November 20, 1759 – July 4, 1854) was  a  farmer from Dover, Vermont and member of the Vermont House of Representatives, serving in 1816 and 1823.

Personal background and family relations
Gardner Howe was born in Shrewsbury, Massachusetts to Jotham Howe (1728-1809) and Priscilla (Rice) Howe (1731-1819).  He was a farmer in Dover, Massachusetts and served in the Continental Army during the Revolution.  On October 29, 1789 he married Abigail Sherman (1771-1843) of Grafton, Massachusetts. In 1816 he was elected to a one-year term in the Vermont House of Representatives, and he was re-elected in 1823. Howe died at his home in Dover on July 4, 1854.  Howe was a direct descendant of John Howe (1602-1680), who arrived in Massachusetts Bay Colony in 1630 from Brinklow, Warwickshire, England and settled in Sudbury, Massachusetts. Gardner Howe was also a descendant of Edmund Rice, an early immigrant to Massachusetts Bay Colony, as follows:

 Gardner Howe, son of:
 Priscilla Rice (1731-1819), daughter of:
 Luke Rice (1689-1754), son of:
 Daniel Rice (1655-1737), son of:
 Edward Rice (1622-1712), son of:
 Edmund Rice, (ca1594-1663)

References 

Members of the Vermont House of Representatives
1759 births
1854 deaths
People from Shrewsbury, Massachusetts
People from Windham County, Vermont